Fortissat is one of the twenty-one wards used to elect members of the North Lanarkshire Council. Created in 2007, it originally returned three councillors; a 2017 national review resulted in no changes in the boundaries but an extra seat being added. The ward's territory covers the town of Shotts and surrounding areas (including Allanton, Bonkle, Harthill, Hartwood, Morningside and Salsburgh) with a population of 15,730 in 2019.

Councillors

Election results

2022 election

2017 election

2017 by-election
Conservative candidate Sandy Thornton refused to sign his acceptance of office, resulting in the seat becoming vacant on 28 June 2017. A by-election took place on 7 September 2017 and was won by Clare Quigley of the Scottish Labour Party.

2021 by-election
On 8 May 2018, councillor Tommy Cochrane resigned from the SNP and became an Independent, citing lack of SNP support in the area. He resigned his seat on 18 March 2020 saying he was increasingly unable to manage personal and work commitments.  A by-election was held in 2021 (delayed by the COVID-19 pandemic in Scotland), won by Labour's Peter Kelly.

2012 election

2007 election

References

Wards of North Lanarkshire
Shotts